The Army General Staff (Estado Mayor General del Ejército, EMGE) is the supreme staff of the Argentine Army. It is based at the Libertador Building, Buenos Aires. His chief is the brigadier general Agustín Humberto Cejas.

History 

The Army General Staff was created on 16 November 1811, at the request of the First Triumvirate. The first leader of the General Staff was Colonel Francisco Javier de Viana.

On 2 January 1884, within the broader context of the reorganization of the country's military forces, the President of Argentina and Lieutenant general Julio Argentino Roca, decreed that the creation of the Army General Staff position was a permanent change.

Organization

Chief of the Army General Staff 

Source: Argentina.gob.ar

 JEMGE Assistantship Secretariat (SAJEMGE). Base: Libertador Building (CABA).
 Army Procurement Assessment Commission (CECE). Base: San Telmo (CABA).
 Army General Inspectorate (IGE). Base: Libertador Building (CABA).
 General Secretary of the Army (SGE). Base: Palermo (CABA).
 General Directorate of Plans, Programs and Budget (DGPPP). Base: Libertador Building (CABA).
 General Directorate of Administration and Finance (DGAF). Base: Libertador Building (CABA).
 General Directorate of Legal Affairs (DGAJ). Base: Libertador Building (CABA).

Deputy Chief of the Army General Staff 

Source: Argentina.gob.ar

 EMGE Accounting and Finance Department (DCF). Base: Libertador Building (CABA).
 Coordination Secretariat of the SUBJEMGE (SC SUBJEMGE). Base: Libertador Building (CABA).
 EMGE Headquarters (Cu Gral EMGE). Base: Libertador Building (CABA).
 General Directorate of Education «Lieutenant General Pablo Riccheri» (DGE). Guar Ej Campo de Mayo (BA).
 Command of the Buenos Aires Military Garrison «Colonel Doctor Roque Sáenz Peña» (CGMBA). Guar Ej Campo de Mayo (BA).
 General Directorate of Communications and Informatics (DGCI). Base: Libertador Building (CABA).
 General Directorate of Personnel and Welfare (DGPB). Base: Libertador Building (CABA).
 General Directorate of Health (DGS). Base: Parque Patricios (CABA).6
 General Directorate of Intelligence (DG Icia). Base: Libertador Building (CABA).
 Engineering and Infrastructure Directorate (DGII). Base: Libertador Building (CABA).
 General Directorate of Research and Development (DGID). Base: Libertador Building (CABA).
 General Directorate of Organization and Doctrine (DGOD). Base: Libertador Building (CABA).
 Remonta and Veterinary Directorate (DRV). Base: Palermo CABA.
 General Directorate of Material (DGM). Base: Palermo CABA.
 General Directorate of Administration (DG Int). Guar Ej El Palomar (BA).
 Army Historical Affairs Directorate (DAHE). Base: San Telmo (CABA).

Chiefs 

The Chief of the Army General Staff is the brigadier general Agustín Humberto Cejas, who holds the office since 28 February 2020.

References 

Argentine Army
Buenos Aires